Maianthemum trifolium (Three-leaf Solomon's-seal, three-leaf Solomon's-plume, threeleaf false lily of the valley, smilacine trifoliée) is a species of flowering plant that is associated with extremely wet environments and is native to Canada and the northeastern United States as well as St. Pierre and Miquelon and Asia (Siberia).

Description
It grows off spreading sympodial rhizomes with roots found only at nodes. New plants produce two petiolate foliage leaves the first year, then a flowering shoot the second year with 2-4 sessile leaves.

Leaves
Leaf bases are narrowly tapered and tips pointed.

Flowering clusters

Flowers and fruits  
Flowers are trimerous, that is, flower parts are in groups of three. Berries contain 1-3 small, rounded seeds. Flowering is May to June, berries remain on plants into September.

Distribution
Found in all Canadian provinces and territories and in the USA in some northeastern states (Connecticut, Maine, Massachusetts, Michigan, Minnesota, New Hampshire, New Jersey, New York, Ohio, Pennsylvania, Rhode Island, Vermont, and Wisconsin). Also found in St. Pierre and Miquelon and Asia (Siberia).

Habitat and ecology
Maianthemum trifolium often forms dense patches in wet forests, sphagnum bogs and other wetlands and is sometimes considered to be aquatic.

Gallery

References

trifolium
Flora of Canada
Flora of the Northeastern United States
Flora without expected TNC conservation status